In the 1950s, the United States FBI began to maintain a public list of the people it regarded as the Ten Most Wanted Fugitives. Following is a brief review of FBI people and events that place the 1950s decade in context, and then an historical list of individual fugitives whose names first appeared on the 10 Most Wanted list during the decade of the 1950s, under FBI Director J. Edgar Hoover.

FBI headlines in decade of 1950s
In late 1949 the FBI helped publish an article about the "toughest guys" the Bureau was after, who remained fugitives from justice. The positive publicity from the story resulted in the birth of the FBI's "Ten Most Wanted Fugitives" list on March 14, 1950.

Cases of espionage against the United States and its allies were some of the prevalent investigations by the Bureau during the 1950s. Eight Nazi agents who had planned sabotage operations against American targets were arrested. Organized crime networks and families in the United States also became targets, including those headed by Sam Giancana and John Gotti.

FBI "Most Wanted Fugitives" in the 1950s
As wanted fugitives were added, and then later removed, the FBI began to keep track of the sequence number in which each fugitive appeared on the list. Some individuals have even appeared twice, and often a sequence number was permanently assigned to an individual fugitive who was soon caught, captured, or simply removed, before his or her appearance could be published on the publicly released list. In those cases, the public would see only gaps in the number sequence reported by the FBI. For convenient reference, the wanted fugitive's sequence number and date of entry on the FBI list appear below, whenever possible.

The most wanted fugitives listed in the decade of the 1950s include (in FBI list appearance sequence  order):

Year 1950

William Francis Sutton
March 20, 1950 #11
William Francis (Willie) Sutton
On February 18, 1952, Sutton was arrested without incident in New York after two years on the list.

Year 1951

George Arthur Heroux
December 19, 1951 #28
George Arthur Heroux
On July 25, 1952, Heroux, who was a bank robber with accomplice and fellow top Ten Fugitive, Gerhard Arthur Puff, was caught at Miami, Florida after seven months on the list.

Year 1952

Gerhard Arthur Puff
January 28, 1952 #30 - was added soon after his partner George Arthur Heroux, #28
Gerhard Arthur Puff
Puff, who was a bank robber with accomplice and fellow top Ten Fugitive, George Arthur Heroux, was caught after killing an FBI Agent in a gunbattle after six months on the list. He was executed two years later.

Year 1953

Year 1954

Year 1955

Year 1956

Year 1957

Year 1958

Year 1959

By the end of the decade, six of the ten places on the list remained filled by these elusive long-time fugitives, then still at large:
 1950 #14 (ten years), Frederick J. Tenuto
 1952 #36 (eight years), James Eddie Diggs
 1954 #78 (six years), David Daniel Keegan
 1956 #97 (four years), Eugene Francis Newman
 1958 #107 (two years), Angelo Luigi Pero
 1959 #112 (one year), Edwin Sanford Garrison

External links
Current FBI top ten most wanted fugitives at FBI site
FBI pdf source document listing all Ten Most Wanted year by year (removed by FBI, mirrored)

1950s in the United States